Northwood is a town in Rockingham County, New Hampshire, United States. The population was 4,641 at the 2020 census.

History 

First settled in 1763, Northwood was incorporated on February 6, 1773 by colonial governor John Wentworth, when a large tract of land called "North Woods" was separated from Nottingham. Around 1800, the Portsmouth to Concord Turnpike was built, and the town began to prosper. Numerous taverns accommodated sledge and stage passengers. At one time, there were some twelve sawmills in the town, five of which were replaced by shoe factories during the latter half of the 19th century. By 1920, however, the last shoe factory had closed. More recently, the town has been a popular vacation spot, being home to nine lakes and many antique shops.

Four Northwood districts along Route 4 are considered historic sections of town. They are, from east to west, East Northwood, Northwood Ridge, Northwood Center and Northwood Narrows. The town is home to Coe-Brown Northwood Academy, founded in 1867.

Geography
Northwood is well known for its lakes, with both seasonal and year-round residences. The larger lakes and ponds include Bow Lake, which drains to the east via the Isinglass River and is part of the Piscataqua River drainage basin, and Northwood Lake, Pleasant Lake, Jenness Pond, Harvey Lake, and Long Pond, all of which drain west to the Suncook River, a tributary of the Merrimack River. Meadow Lake near the center of Northwood is at the headwaters of the south-flowing Lamprey River, part of the Piscataqua River watershed, and the east side of town contains the headwaters of the Bean River and North River, tributaries of the Lamprey.

Adjacent municipalities
 Strafford, New Hampshire (north)
 Barrington, New Hampshire (east)
 Nottingham, New Hampshire (southeast)
 Deerfield, New Hampshire (south)
 Epsom, New Hampshire (west)
 Pittsfield, New Hampshire (northwest)

Ecosystem
Northwood has a diverse ecosystem with many various flora and fauna. The climate of Northwood is a temperate, humid continental climate, with warm summers and cold, snowy winters. Some of the flora and fauna that can be seen in Northwood are as follows.

Flora

Sugar maple
White birch
Pink lady's slipper
Eastern white pine
Northern red oak
Eastern hemlock
Quaking aspen
Big-tooth aspen
Red maple
Hobblebush

Fauna

Fisher
American black bear
Raccoon
Red fox
White-tailed deer
Common loon
Bald eagle
Coyote
Barred owl
Great horned owl
Moose
Osprey
Eastern wild turkey
Great blue heron
Eastern gray squirrel
Eastern chipmunk
North American porcupine
Striped skunk
Opossum
Groundhog
Largemouth bass
Smallmouth bass
Pickerel
Yellow perch
North American beaver
Common snapping turtle
Painted turtle
Common garter snake
Eastern American toad
Red-spotted newt

Demographics

As of the census of 2000, there were 3,640 people, 1,347 households, and 1,000 families residing in the town.  The population density was 130.1 people per square mile (50.2/km).  There were 1,905 housing units at an average density of 68.1 per square mile (26.3/km).  The racial makeup of the town was 97.53% White, 0.30% African American, 0.30% Native American, 0.66% Asian, 0.14% Pacific Islander, 0.19% from other races, and 0.88% from two or more races. Hispanic or Latino of any race were 0.55% of the population.

There were 1,347 households, out of which 36.7% had children under the age of 18 living with them, 62.0% were married couples living together, 7.7% had a female householder with no husband present, and 25.7% were non-families. 18.0% of all households were made up of individuals, and 5.1% had someone living alone who was 65 years of age or older.  The average household size was 2.70 and the average family size was 3.07.

In the town, the population was spread out, with 27.1% under the age of 18, 6.6% from 18 to 24, 32.1% from 25 to 44, 25.2% from 45 to 64, and 9.0% who were 65 years of age or older.  The median age was 37 years. For every 100 females, there were 100.3 males.  For every 100 females age 18 and over, there were 99.3 males.

The median income for a household in the town was $50,675, and the median income for a family was $53,953. Males had a median income of $36,161 versus $27,721 for females. The per capita income for the town was $21,491.  About 1.5% of families and 4.2% of the population were below the poverty line, including 3.0% of those under age 18 and 3.0% of those age 65 or over.

Transportation 
Five New Hampshire state routes and two U.S. routes cross Northwood.

 NH 9, U.S. Route 4, and U.S. Route 202 run concurrently through town from the western border with Epsom to the center of town. US 4 continues east into Nottingham, while US 202 and NH 9 continue north into Barrington. US 4 is known locally as First New Hampshire Turnpike. US 202 and NH 9 north of US 4 is known as Rochester Road.
 NH 43 runs through the east side of town from the southern border with Deerfield to First New Hampshire Turnpike. It is known locally as Mountain Avenue.
 NH 107 enters from Epsom at the western border of town in the vicinity of Northwood Lake, and is concurrent with NH 9, US 4, and US 202 until it turns north in Northwood Narrows. It turns northwest and enters Pittsfield. NH 107 is locally known as School Street and Catamount Road.
 NH 202A is an auxiliary route of US 202 connecting Strafford to Northwood, near the town center. It is locally known as Strafford Road.
 NH 152 runs for a very short distance in the eastern edge of town, connecting US 4 to Nottingham. It is locally known as Nottingham Road for the short distance in Northwood.

Notable people 

 Albert O. Brown (1852–1937), politician, 58th governor of New Hampshire; born in Northwood (1852)
 Ella Knowles (1860–1911), lawyer and politician; born in Northwood (1860)

Camps
Northwood is home to Camp Yavneh, a Jewish summer camp founded in 1944 on Lucas Pond, and Wah-Tut-Ca Scout Reservation, a Boy Scout Camp run by the Spirit of Adventure Council.

References

Further reading
Bailey, J.W. (1992), A Guide to the History and Old Dwelling Places of Northwood, New Hampshire, Second Edition, Peter E. Randall Publisher, Portsmouth, NH, 305 pp.

External links

 
 Northwood Historical Society
 New Hampshire Economic and Labor Market Information Bureau Profile

 
Towns in Rockingham County, New Hampshire
Populated places established in 1773
Towns in New Hampshire
1773 establishments in New Hampshire